Juan Manuel Bayón (November 15, 1926 – December 12, 2017) was an Argentine military officer, retired brigadier general, and government official during the National Reorganization Process military dictatorship. He held the position of Governor of Misiones Province from March 31, 1981, until December 11, 1983.

Bayón died on December 12, 2017, at the age of 91. He was buried in La Recoleta Cemetery in Buenos Aires on December 14, 2017.

References

1926 births
2017 deaths
Governors of Misiones Province
Argentine Army officers
Argentine brigadiers
Burials at La Recoleta Cemetery
People from Buenos Aires